Jorge de Lencastre, or George of Lencastre (1548–1578), was the older son of Dom John of Lencastre, 1st Duke of Aveiro and of his wife Juliana de Lara, daughter of the 3rd Marquis of Vila Real.

Until his father's death, he used the title of Marquis of Torres Novas, and also succeeded him as 2nd Duke of Aveiro in 1571.

He was a close adviser to King Sebastian I of Portugal and he escorted him, both to the Guadalupe interview (where Sebastian met his uncle, King Philip II of Spain) and to the Portuguese campaign to Morocco. George was killed in the Battle of Alcácer Quibir, together with the King, in 1578.

Before, he had married Madalena Girón, sister of the Spanish 1st Duke of Ossuna, from whom he had a single daughter:
 Juliana of Lencastre, 3rd Duchess of Aveiro, married to Álvaro of Lencastre, 3rd Duke of Aveiro.

See also
Infante George of Lencastre
John of Lencastre, 1st Duke of Aveiro
Duke of Aveiro
Duke of Torres Novas
Marquis of Torres Novas

External links
 Genealogy of George of Lencastre, 2nd Duke of Aveiro, in Portuguese

Bibliography
 ”Nobreza de Portugal e do Brasil” – Vol. II, page 343. Published by Zairol Lda., Lisbon 1989.

102
Portuguese nobility
1548 births
1578 deaths
16th-century Portuguese people